Kachcha Limboo is a 2017 Marathi language feature film directed by Prasad Oak and produced by Mandar Devasthali. The film was the recipient of the 2017 National Film Award in the Best Arts/Cultural Film category.

Cast 
 Ravi Jadhav as Mohan Katdare
 Sachin Khedekar as Mr. Pandit
 Sonali Kulkarni as Shaila Katdare
 Manmeet Pem as Bachchu Katdare
 Ananth Narayan Mahadevan as Venkat
 Uday Sabnis

Awards

Reception 
Nandani Ramnath of Scroll.in stated "The genteel poverty of a Mumbai chawl is superbly lensed by Amalendu Chaudhary in vivid black-and-white to heighten the family’s general state of impoverishment. Colour is used only for scenes and objects that depict a happier past – the hope-filled union between Mohan and Shaila, their joy at the birth of their son, the wedding sari and perfume that remind Shaila of her fading feminine side."

The Times of India gave it four stars out of five and wrote "Kaccha Limbu is easily one of the best films in Marathi cinema. Though shot in black and white, it has multiple layers that boast of fantastic writing and execution. Don’t miss this one."

Writing in Pune Mirror Ganesh Matkari states "Kaccha Limbu ends on a positive note, slightly different from the play, but this is the right approach. To an extent, reflects the change in societal attitudes towards mental disabilities, which has only recently taken place. At the same time, it uplifts the viewer and offers the right context for the dark film."

References

External links 

 

2010s Marathi-language films
2018 films